Esteban Siller Garza (17 April 1931 – 23 October 2013) was a Mexican voice actor from Monterrey, Nuevo León.

Filmography
King in La cenicienta (1950) (redub)
Bull in Lady and the Tramp (1955) (redub)
Peter Potamus in Yogi's Gang (1973-1974)
Otto in Robin Hood (1973)
Doogie Daddy in Laff-a-Lympics (1977-1979)
Almirante Boom in Mary Poppins (1980)
Gargamel in The Smurfs (Hanna-Barbera series) (1981-198?)
 Admiral Ackbar in Star Wars Episode VI: El regreso del Jedi (1983) (1997 redoblaje)
Dolben and Doli in The Black Cauldron (1985)
Dawson in The Great Mouse Detective (1986)
Maurice in La Bella y la Bestia (1992)
Newman in Seinfeld (1992–1998)
Terada Torahiko in Doomed Megalopolis (1993)
Lind in Sol Bianca (1993)
C in Key the Metal Idol (1994)
Carface in Todos los perros van al cielo 2 (1996)
Vladimir in Anastasia (1997)
Geri in Toy Story 2 (1999)
 Rudy the Old Man in Las locuras de el emperador (2000)
Jacob in Jose, el rey de los sueños (2000)
Cookie in Atlantis: El Imperio Perdido (2001)
Cookie in Atlantis: El Regreso de Milo
Doc in Snow White Redub (2001)
Doc in House of Mouse
Doc in The Lion King 1½
Doc in Mickey's Magical Christmas: Snowed in at the House of Mouse
 Papa Elf (Bob Newhart) in Elf
Belvedere in Mr. Belvedere
 Tex Dinoco in Cars (2006)
 Gus (Mickey Rooney) in Night at the Museum (2006)
Master Oggway in Kung Fu Panda
Quincy Magoo in Kung Fu Magoo
Sir Cumference in Pac-Man and the Ghostly Adventures (2013) (1st voice, episodes 3-23)

References

Mexican male voice actors
Male actors from Monterrey
1931 births
2013 deaths